Chelsea is a 2010 Ghanaian direct-to-video thriller film directed by Moses Inwang, and starring Majid Michel, Nadia Buari & John Dumelo.

Cast
Majid Michel as Sylvester
Brenda Bonsu as Katy
John Dumelo as Marlon
Nadia Buari as Chelsea
Sa-Ada Sadiq as Cashier
Rispa Nyumutsu as Waitress
Amanorbea Dodoo as Chelsea Mum
Roger Quartey as Chauffeur
Jonathan Pali Sherren as Chelsea Dad
Dan Tei-Mensah as Greg
Artus Frank as Gideon (Chelsea’s Brother)

Reception
Nollywood Reinvented gave it a rating 2.5 out of 5 stars. It gave a 0/5 originality rating and explained further that "...The movie Chelsea is apparently a rip of the 2008 Bollywood movie Mehbooba starring Ajay Devgn (in Majid’s character), Manisha Koirala (as Nadia Buari) and Sanjay Dutt (as John Dumelo)."

NollywoodForever gave it an 82% rating. The site noted the actors and actresses were well cast and enjoyable to watch, both for their acting talent and their good looks.

References

External links

2010 films
2010 thriller drama films
Nigerian thriller drama films
Ghanaian drama films
2010 direct-to-video films
2010 drama films
2010s English-language films
English-language Nigerian films
English-language Ghanaian films